This is a list of notable people associated with the London Borough of Tower Hamlets in London, England.

 Kia Abdullah author; born in Mile End, went to school in Bow.
 Damon Albarn singer-songwriter for bands Blur, Gorillaz; born in Whitechapel.
 Joe Anderson 'All England' boxing champion of 1897.
 Cheryl Baker member of Bucks Fizz, winners of the 1981 Eurovision Song Contest, grew up in Roman Road, Bethnal Green.
 Danny Boyle film director, producer and screenwriter; lives in Mile End.
 Andy Lee (boxer)  Professional Boxer; born in Bow.
 Rosa Nouchette Carey children's novelist; born in Stratford-le-Bow.
 Ashley Cole footballer, played for Arsenal's invincibles; born in Stepney; attended Bow Boys School.
 Steve Conway singer (1920–1952), born in Bethnal Green.
 Donald Crisp Academy Award-winning actor; born in Bow.
 Ralph Fiennes actor; lives in Bethnal Green.
 Clara Grant educational pioneer and social reformer.
 John Granville Harkness Major-General in the British Army of the Victorian era.
 Peter Green guitarist and songwriter, founder of Fleetwood Mac; born in Mile End.
 Perry Groves footballer, played for Arsenal; born in Bow.
 Felicity Jones actress, lives in Bethnal Green.
 Isaac Julien artist, raised in Bow.
 Ledley King former footballer; defender for Tottenham Hotspur; born in Bow.
 Oona King former Labour MP for Bethnal Green and Bow; political commentator.
 Eddie Marsan actor; grew up in Bethnal Green.
 Charlie McDonnell comedian and musician; YouTube personality; shares a flat in Bow.
 Ian McKellen  award-winning actor; lives in Limehouse.
 Margaret Moran former Labour MP for Luton South.
 Graham Norton comedian and television presenter; lives in Wapping.
 Sylvia Pankhurst suffragette and social campaigner.
 Lutfur Rahman former Mayor of Tower Hamlets (2010-2015; lives in Whitechapel.
 Harry Redknapp former footballer; manager, Queens Park Rangers.
 Dizzee Rascal grime musician.
 John Robertson Premier of New South Wales, Australia, on five occasions between 1881 and 1886; born in Bow.
 Tinchy Stryder grime musician.
 Joakim Sundström Swedish sound editor, sound designer and musician; has a flat south of Bow.
 Danny Wallace filmmaker, comedian, writer, actor, and presenter of radio and television; lives in Bow.
 Wiley grime musician, urban artist.
 Glen Wilkie (born 1977), League 1 football player.
 Amy Winehouse jazz singer-songwriter; had a flat in Bow.

See also

 List of mayors of Tower Hamlets
 List of people from London

References

Tower Hamlets